Japanese Army can refer to:
 the Imperial Japanese Army, 1868–1945
 the Japan Ground Self-Defense Force, 1954–present